Elections for the Third Punjab Legislative Assembly were held in February 1962. There were total 756 candidates. The Indian National Congress won the election with 90 seats.

Result

Elected members

References

Punjab
State Assembly elections in Punjab, India
1960s in Punjab, India